The Hainan Library is located in the Hainan Cultural Park at 36 Guoxing Avenue, Haikou, Hainan, China. It was established on February 2, 2007.

The facility is one of three large, public works projects constructed around the same time on Guoxing Avenue alongside one another, the others being Hainan Museum and Hainan Centre for the Performing Arts.

See also
Libraries in the People's Republic of China
Chinese Library Classification (CLC)
Archives in the People's Republic of China

References

External links
 Official website

Buildings and structures in Haikou
Organizations based in Haikou
Libraries in Hainan
Library buildings completed in 2007
2007 establishments in China
Libraries established in 2007